Elpidio Desiderio Concha Arellano (born 29 March 1963) is a Mexican politician affiliated with the Institutional Revolutionary Party. As of 2014, he served as Deputy of the LIX and LXI Legislatures of the Mexican Congress representing Oaxaca.

References

1963 births
Living people
People from Chiapas
Institutional Revolutionary Party politicians
21st-century Mexican politicians
Deputies of the LIX Legislature of Mexico
Members of the Chamber of Deputies (Mexico) for Oaxaca